Berkeley Hundred was a Virginia Colony, founded in 1619, which comprised about eight thousand acres (32 km²) on the north bank of the James River. It was near Herring Creek in an area which is now known as Charles City County, Virginia. It was the site of an early documented Thanksgiving when the settlers landed in what later was the United States. In 1622, following the Indian Massacre of 1622, the colony was for a time abandoned. In the mid 18th century, it became known as Berkeley Plantation, the traditional home of the Harrison family of Virginia. In 1862, amid fighting in the Civil War, the area was the scene of the creation and first bugle rendition of present-day "Taps".

History
Berkeley Hundred was a land grant in 1618 of the Virginia Company of London to Sir William Throckmorton, Sir George Yeardley, George Thorpe, Richard Berkeley, and John Smyth (1567–1641) of Nibley. Smyth was also the historian of the Berkeley group, collecting over 60 documents relating to the settlement of Virginia between 1613 and 1634 which have survived to modern times.

In 1619, the ship Margaret of Bristol, England sailed for Virginia under Captain John Woodliffe and brought thirty-eight settlers to the new Town and Hundred of Berkeley. The London Company proprietors instructed the settlers that "the day of our ships arrival . . . shall be yearly and perpetually kept as a day of Thanksgiving." The Margaret landed her passengers at Berkeley Hundred on December 4, 1619. The settlers did indeed celebrate a day of "Thanksgiving", establishing the tradition two years and 17 days before the Pilgrims arrived aboard the Mayflower at Plymouth, Massachusetts to establish their Thanksgiving Day in 1621.

On March 22, 1622, Opchanacanough, head of the Powhatan Confederacy, began the Second Anglo-Powhatan War with a coordinated series of attacks against English settlements along the James River, known in English histories as the Indian massacre of 1622. Nine colonists were killed at Berkeley. The assault took a heavier toll elsewhere, killing about a third of all the colonists, and virtually wiping out Wolstenholme Towne on Martin's Hundred and Sir Thomas Dale's progressive development and new college at Henricus. Jamestown was spared through a timely warning and became the refuge for many survivors who abandoned outlying settlements. A myth about the March 22 date was that it occurred on Good Friday.  This is incorrect.

For several years thereafter, the plantation at Berkeley Hundred lay abandoned, until William Tucker and others got possession of it in 1636, and it became the property of John Bland, a merchant of London. By this time, the area had become part of Charles City Shire in 1634, later renamed Charles City County.

Giles Bland, son of John Bland, inherited it, but he was hanged by Governor Sir William Berkeley in 1676, after participating in Bacon's Rebellion. Confiscated by Governor Berkeley, the land was purchased in 1691 by Benjamin Harrison (1673–1710), attorney general of the colony, treasurer and speaker of the House of Burgesses. He died at age thirty-seven in 1710, leaving the property to his only son, also named Benjamin.

The Berkeley Hundred was the next plantation down river from the Shirley Plantation.

References

Colony of Virginia
Geography of Charles City County, Virginia
1619 establishments in Virginia